Ga-Ramela (formerly called Teneriffe) is a large village in Ga-Matlala in the Mogalakwena Local Municipality of the Waterberg District Municipality of the Limpopo province of South Africa. It is located 80 km northwest of Polokwane on the Matlala Road.

Education 
Ramela Primary School.
Kgabedi Secondary School.

References 

Populated places in the Mogalakwena Local Municipality